A catalog merchant (catalogue merchant in Commonwealth English) is a form of retailing. The typical merchant sells a wide variety of household and personal products, with many emphasizing jewelry.  Unlike a self-serve retail store, most of the items are not displayed; customers select the products from printed catalogs in the store and fill out an order form.  The order is brought to the sales counter, where a clerk retrieves the items from the warehouse area to a payment and checkout station.

Purpose 
The catalog merchant has generally lower prices than other retailers and lower overhead expenses due to the smaller size of store and lack of large showroom space.

There are a few key benefits to this approach. By operating as an in-store catalog sales center, it could be exempt from the "Resale price maintenance" policy of the manufacturers, which can force conventional retailers to charge a minimum sales price to prevent price-cutting competition; it also reduces the risk of merchandise theft, known in the industry as shrinkage.

From the consumer's point of view, there are potential advantages and disadvantages. The catalog showroom approach allows customers to shop without having to carry their purchases throughout the store as they shop. Possible downsides include that customers may be required to give their contact information when an order is placed, take the time to fill out order forms, and wait a period of time for their order to be available for purchase. This wait may be days long, one of the chief vulnerabilities of the catalog showroom approach.

The merchant catalog is easily customizable, which allows reaching out to different target audiences. In addition to that, a merchant catalog is a way to transform a product database to a powerful marketing tool.

Countries

Canada
Consumers Distributing operated over 400 stores in Canada and the United States, and closed in 1996. Competitors in the Montreal area included Cardinal Distributors (launched by Steinberg but sold to Consumers Distributing in 1979) and Unique (folded in the 1970s).  Shop-Rite, which operated 65 stores in Ontario, closed its doors in 1982.  Sears Canada Inc still issues over 15 printed catalogues every year. Included in these (15) printed catalogues are three (3) large catalogues - the Spring and Summer Catalogue, the Fall and Winter General Catalogue, and the popular Christmas WishBook catalogue. In fall 2012, Sears Canada catalogue issued its 60th anniversary WishBook edition.

United Kingdom 

In the United Kingdom, the sole national general goods catalogue merchant left in the high street market is Argos.  Former catalogue retailers include Littlewoods, which owned the 'Index' brand as a high street competitor to Argos and Kays, which unlike Argos and Littlewoods/Index had no shops and sold only by postal orders.  Littlewoods, Kays and existing Grattan built their businesses around offering credit, however in the 21st century most High Street shops now offer store cards (a means of credit specific to the retailer) meaning these catalogues have lost some of their market niche.

Littlewoods also ran a smaller catalogue that did not offer credit called Index.  Unlike goods from the Littlewoods Catalogue, which were purchased via postal order, Index goods could be purchased at Index branches and some branches of the Littlewoods department stores.

Unlike Littlewoods, Kays and Grattan, who focused mainly on Clothing, Argos (and formerly Index) focus primarily on furniture, electronics and white goods.  In 2001, Argos started a clothing catalogue called Argos Additions, however they sold the brand to Shop Direct Group in 2004.

In 2021, Argos ceased production of its printed catalogue, but an electronic catalogue can be browsed in-store as well as online.

United States 
Catalog merchants in the United States have declined since 1980, in favor of chain discounters, big box stores, and internet shopping. Prominent among catalog merchants during the 19th and 20th centuries were Belknap Hardware and Manufacturing Company and Sears, Roebuck & Company.

The repeal of the resale price maintenance sanctioning law in 1980 meant that chain discounters such as Wal-Mart and KMart could set and change prices at will, in a more consumer-friendly environment where the customer can examine the goods and confirm availability before approaching sales staff.  As a result, this retail sector went into decline in the 1980s.  As big box stores and internet shopping became increasingly popular in the 1990s, the decline of the catalog merchant business accelerated.

Many companies in recent years have moved away from relying solely on catalog sales, augmenting them with online sales or direct retail. The move toward online sales includes long-established department store chains such as Sears and JCPenney that relied heavily on catalog sales. However, many long-established catalog merchants have gone out of business since the 1980s, including Best Products, Brendle's, Ellman's, Jafco, KeyMid, Montgomery Ward, Rink's, Aldens, H. J. Wilson Co., Service Merchandise, Sterling Jewelry & Distributing Company and Consumers Distributing. The Houston Jewelry & Distributing Company division of Sterling Jewelry & Distributing Company was successfully reconfigured as a full service fine jewelry and gift store in 1993 and has been in operation ever since.  Houston Jewelry remains the only former catalog showroom to successfully return to a traditional jewelry format.

References

External links
Multichannel Merchant Magazine (Formerly Catalog Age)
Mail Order Blog Offering Information On Various Mail Order Merchants)
 JCK Houston Jewelry Breaks Catalog Showroom Shackles

 
Non-store retailing